Francis McMenemy (1910 – 1976) was a Scottish footballer who played as a left half for clubs including Hamilton Academical, Northampton Town and Crystal Palace.

He was one of several footballers in his family: father Jimmy played mainly for Celtic, elder brother John for Motherwell and younger brother Harry for Newcastle United.

References

1910 births
1976 deaths
Association football wing halves
Sportspeople from Rutherglen
Scottish people of Irish descent
Footballers from Glasgow
Scottish footballers
Hamilton Academical F.C. players
Northampton Town F.C. players
Crystal Palace F.C. players
Alloa Athletic F.C. players
Guildford City F.C. players
Scotland junior international footballers
Scottish Junior Football Association players
Burnbank Athletic F.C. players
English Football League players
Southern Football League players
Scottish Football League players
Frank
Footballers from South Lanarkshire